was a Japanese swimmer. He competed in two events at the 1924 Summer Olympics. He died during World War II.

References

External links
 

1903 births
1944 deaths
Japanese male backstroke swimmers
Olympic swimmers of Japan
Swimmers at the 1924 Summer Olympics
Place of birth missing
Japanese military personnel killed in World War II